Franz Xaver Ritter von Gietl (27 August 1803 – 19 March 1888) was a German physician.

Life 

Gietl studied medicine at the universities of Landshut, Würzburg and Munich. In 1827 he received his doctorate form the University of Munich with a pathological work on neuro ganglia.

1831 he was sent by the government to examine the cholera in Bohemia, Moravia and Silesia. In 1834 he was appointed to the post of the personal physician to the then crown prince and later king Maximilian II of Bavaria. In addition in 1838 he became professor at the University of Munich and from 1842 to 1851 Director of the Municipal Clinic of Munich (Klinikum links der Isar). With the end of the winter semester 1885/1886 he retired as lecturer because of his advancing heart disease.

Gietls work focussed on Cholera and Typhoid fever esp. clinical observations and their treatment. In addition he published on Erysipelas and statistical observations at the Municipal Clinic.

On the occasion of his 80th birthday in 1883 he became the 11th Honorary Citizen of Munich (comp. List of honorary citizens of Munich).

Works

References 

     
 Julius Pagel (edit.) (1901) (in German). "Gietl, Franz Xaver Ritter von" In Biographisches Lexikon hervorragender Ärzte des 19. Jahrhunderts. (Biographical encyclopedia of distinguished physicians of the 19th century). Berlin, Wien: Urban & Schwarzenberg. pp. 599–600.

1803 births
1888 deaths
Academic staff of the Ludwig Maximilian University of Munich
19th-century German physicians
Physicians from Munich
People from Dillingen (district)